The JAR-FCL is the Joint Aviation Requirements Flight Crew License, an international designation of member states pilots' (and other related aviation) licenses. The Private Pilot License is abbreviated as JAR PPL.

Authority
The licenses are granted by each member state signatory to the international treaty establishing air law between nations. The treaty establishes the international law agreements between signatories, including agreements about certifying and passing of equipment and crew between the airspace of different nations.

Countries are free to establish laws for operation within their boundaries. When international operations occur, the member states' local laws are expected to align with the international agreement. The JAR-FCL is one such case of this alignment. If a nation grants a JAR-FCL, the license fits a common criterion such that it is honored in all member states.

Deviations in the implementation
In some European Union states there are deviations to the JAR (Joint Aviation Requirements) Medical fitness criteria.

See also
 Pilot licensing in the United Kingdom
 Pilot certification in the United States

External links
 JAA Licensing-Training & Examinations

Aviation medicine

Aviation medicine
Aviation licenses and certifications